Karabük is an electoral district of the Grand National Assembly of Turkey created in 1995. It elects three members of parliament (deputies) to represent the province of the same name for a five-year term by the D'Hondt method, a party-list proportional representation system. Until 1995, voters were registered to Zonguldak or Çankırı electoral districts.

Members 
Population reviews of each electoral district are conducted before each general election, which can lead to certain districts being granted a smaller or greater number of parliamentary seats. As a small electoral district, Karabük's seat allocation has always been low. It was three when electoral district was created in 1995. During 2011-2017, MP number is reduced to two.

General elections

2018

2015 November

2015 June

2011

2007

2002 

 Contested as SİP in previous election.

1999

1995

Presidential elections

2018

2014

Referendums

References 

Electoral districts of Turkey
Politics of Karabük Province